Yang Wang (born 25 March 1976 in Hebei, China) is a New Zealand sport shooter of Chinese origin. Yang represented his adopted nation New Zealand at the 2008 Summer Olympics in Beijing, where he competed in the men's 10 m air pistol. He finished only in thirty-ninth place by two points behind Germany's Florian Schmidt from the final attempt, for a total score of 571 targets.

References

External links

ISSF Profile
NBC 2008 Olympics profile

New Zealand male sport shooters
Living people
Olympic shooters of New Zealand
Shooters at the 2008 Summer Olympics
Chinese emigrants to New Zealand
Sportspeople from Hebei
1976 births
Shooters at the 2006 Commonwealth Games
Commonwealth Games competitors for New Zealand